The Military ranks of Eritrea are the military insignia used by the Eritrean Defence Forces.

Commissioned officer ranks
The rank insignia of commissioned officers.

Other ranks
The rank insignia of non-commissioned officers and enlisted personnel.

References

External links
 

Eritrea
Military of Eritrea